5ive, or Five, is a British boy band.

5ive may also refer to:

 Five (Five album), 1998
 5ive (American band), an instrumental band from Boston
 "5ive", a song by Medicine from Shot Forth Self Living
 5ive (web series), a 2016 Nigerian series
The 5ive, a BET television show

See also

5 (disambiguation)
The Five (disambiguation)